Wiebren Veenstra (born 8 December 1966) is a Dutch former professional racing cyclist. He rode in two editions of the Tour de France.

References

External links
 

1966 births
Living people
Dutch male cyclists
Cyclists from Friesland
People from Achtkarspelen